John Bourinot may refer to:

John C. Bourinot (1864–1929), politician in Nova Scotia, Canada
John George Bourinot (elder) (1814–1884), Canadian politician
John George Bourinot (younger) (1836–1902), his son, Canadian journalist, historian and civil servant